The Office of the Parliamentary Counsel to the Government is the Office of the Parliamentary Counsel to the Government of Ireland. It is part of the office of the Attorney General of Ireland. It drafts bills which the Government intends to introduce in the Oireachtas. Although the Oireachtas as the legislature has formal authority to enact legislation, in practice the government whip rarely allows substantive amendments to bills to be made in the Dáil or Seanad; thus the Parliamentary Counsel's role is crucial.

References

External links